Juan Jesús Calatayud Sánchez (born 21 December 1979) is a Spanish former footballer who played as a goalkeeper.

He played 96 matches in La Liga over the course of eight seasons, in representation of Málaga, Racing de Santander, Hércules and Mallorca. He also competed professionally in Hungary (winning the national championship with Videoton in 2015) and India.

Club career
Calatayud was born in Antequera, Province of Málaga. After graduating from Málaga CF's youth system, and spending a few weeks in summer 2002 on loan to lowly Algeciras CF, he returned to the Andalusians' first team and went on to appear in 36 La Liga games over two seasons, his debut in the competition coming on 29 October 2003 in a 2–1 away loss against Athletic Bilbao. Subsequently, he represented, still in the top flight, Getafe CF (also loaned) and Racing de Santander, mostly as a backup or third choice; in 2007–08, whilst with the Cantabrians, he was not given a jersey and was forced to train separately from his teammates.

In July 2008, Calatayud joined Segunda División side Hércules CF on a two-year deal. He only missed one league match in his first year, as the club fell short of promotion by just three points.

Calatayud continued as Hércules' starter in 2009–10, keeping the most clean sheets in the whole league for the first half of the campaign. Eventually, even though he was not awarded the Ricardo Zamora Trophy, his team finished with the best defensive record in the league and returned to the top division after a 13-year absence.

Calatayud was again an undisputed starter in the 2010–11 season, but the Valencians were immediately relegated. In July, the 31-year-old returned to the top tier, signing with RCD Mallorca for two years and backing up Dudu Aouate during his spell (13 appearances in all competitions).

Calatayud spent the later part of his career abroad, first with Videoton FC in Hungary then Atlético de Kolkata in the Indian Super League. The 36-year-old moved to local Antequera in the summer of 2016 as they competed in the Tercera División, retiring at the end of the campaign.

Club statistics

Honours
Videoton
Nemzeti Bajnokság I: 2014–15
Magyar Kupa runner-up: 2014–15
Ligakupa runner-up: 2013–14

References

External links

1979 births
Living people
People from Antequera
Sportspeople from the Province of Málaga
Spanish footballers
Footballers from Andalusia
Association football goalkeepers
La Liga players
Segunda División players
Segunda División B players
Tercera División players
Atlético Malagueño players
Málaga CF players
Algeciras CF footballers
Getafe CF footballers
Racing de Santander players
Hércules CF players
RCD Mallorca players
Antequera CF footballers
Nemzeti Bajnokság I players
Fehérvár FC players
Indian Super League players
ATK (football club) players
Spanish expatriate footballers
Expatriate footballers in Hungary
Expatriate footballers in India
Spanish expatriate sportspeople in Hungary
Spanish expatriate sportspeople in India